Yves Malatier is a French retired competitive ice dancer. He competed with Muriel Boucher and together they are the 1977 and 1978 French national champions. They competed twice at the European Figure Skating Championships, with the highest placement of 13th, which they achieved in 1978. They placed 15th at the 1978 World Figure Skating Championships.

Results
(ice dance with Muriel Boucher)

References

French male ice dancers
Living people
Year of birth missing (living people)